Robert Wallon (born 23 March 1975) is a retired Polish football midfielder.

References

1975 births
Living people
Polish footballers
Górnik Zabrze players
Neuchâtel Xamax FCS players
Yverdon-Sport FC players
Étoile Carouge FC players
FC Baden players
BSC Young Boys players
FC Vaduz players
Expatriate footballers in Liechtenstein
Association football midfielders
Swiss Super League players
Polish expatriate footballers
Expatriate footballers in Switzerland
Polish expatriate sportspeople in Switzerland